USS Peoria (PF-67), a , was the third ship of the United States Navy to be named after Peoria, Illinois.

Construction
Peoria was constructed by the Leathem D. Smith Shipbuilding Company, and was completed in Sturgeon Bay, Wisconsin on 25 May 1943. Launched on 2 October 1943, sponsored by Agnes Reynolds, she was commissioned on 2 January 1945, at Houston, Texas, under the command of Commander George R. Leslie, USCG.

Service history

Peorias shakedown voyage (or sea trial) commenced on 12 January 1945, bound for the North Atlantic Ocean around Bermuda, and returned successfully to Norfolk, Virginia.

Peorias first mission, begun on 4 March, was to sail with a convoy for the British Crown colony of Gibraltar. Peoria then continued on to Mers El Kébir, Algeria, concluding her journey on 19 March. She joined a returning convoy from Oran on 27 March, assigned with escorting it to the United States.  Peoria then spent a brief amount of time at New York City, until she was called out for use in anti-submarine training at Casco Bay, Maine. On 7 May, she departed Casco Bay bound for New London, Connecticut. Peoria arrived at New London in time for VE day, as World War II concluded. Peoria spent two weeks training submarine crews at New London.

On 21 May, Peoria left New London, assigned to Charleston, South Carolina, where she was to be fitted out for patrol duty in the Atlantic. Peoria was used for weather station work from 21 June, visiting stations in North Atlantic ports from Bermuda to Iceland for a further year.

Decommissioning and sale
On 15 May 1946, Peoria was officially decommissioned, and her name was removed from the Navy List four days later. Her sale to Cuba was overseen by the Foreign Liquidation Commission, part of the State Department.

Peoria was renamed Antonio Maceo (F-302) on 16 June 1947, and served in the Cuban Navy until 1975, when she was sunk.

References

External links 

 
hazegray.org: USS Peoria

Tacoma-class frigates
Ships built in Sturgeon Bay, Wisconsin
1943 ships
World War II frigates and destroyer escorts of the United States
Tacoma-class frigates of the Cuban Navy
Weather ships
Ships sunk as targets
Maritime incidents in 1975